The Goon Sax was an Australian indie pop trio from Brisbane. Formed in 2013, the band consisted of Riley Jones (vocals, drums, lead guitar), Louis Forster (vocals, rhythm guitar, bass) and James Harrison (bass, rhythm guitar, backing vocals). The band are joined by Alistair Taylor (lead guitar, keyboards, drums) for live performances. Forster is the son of Robert Forster, co-founder of indie rock band the Go-Betweens. The band released their debut studio album, Up to Anything, in 2016 on the Chapter Music label. This was followed by We're Not Talking in 2018, and Mirror II in 2021. They have performed with Twerps, Blank Realm, U.S. Girls, and Crayon Fields, among other artists.

The band's name is a play on words combining the Australian vernacular for boxed wine, a 'goon sack', with the musical instrument the saxophone.

History
Forster and Harrison started the Goon Sax when they were still in high school. The two began by collaborating on songs together in Harrison's bedroom. In March 2014, Jones joined the band after taking drum lessons for a month. In September 2015, Chapter Music released their debut single, "Sometimes Accidentally," followed by their second, "Boyfriend," two months later. In early 2016, the band played at Laneway Festival in Brisbane. On 8 April 2016, they released their debut studio album Up to Anything. They went on their final tour as the starter act for Snail Mail in the US, and UK in 2022.

Despite not completing the tour's US dates, the band announced their break up on their Instagram account on 13 July 2022.

Critical reception

Up to Anything has a score of 82 out of 100 on Metacritic based on 8 reviews, indicating that it has received "universal acclaim" from critics. In December 2016, Billboard included the album on their critics' list of the Top 50 albums of the year, putting it in 49th place. Billboard described the album as a "gorgeous collection of slacker-default rock". Pitchfork Media's Maria Sherman gave the album a 7.0 score out of 10, writing, "Each song is well-structured and wise beyond its years  while the messages are confused, delicate and very, very teenage." NMEs Matilda Edwards described the album as "near-flawless guitar pop". Robert Christgau gave it an A−, writing that the band was "cruder than even the earliest Go-Betweens, who were a university band after all, and somewhat static at their worst. Usually, however, they're charming at least."

We're Not Talking was included in Loud and Quiet's and Under the Radar's best-albums-of-2018 lists, respectively putting it at No. 34 and No. 92.

Discography

Albums

References

External links
The Goon Sax at Chapter Music's website

Australian indie pop groups
Australian musical trios
Musical groups established in 2013
Musical groups disestablished in 2022
2013 establishments in Australia
2022 disestablishments in Australia
Musical groups from Brisbane